Stetsasonic is an American hip hop band. Formed in 1981 in Brooklyn, New York City, New York, Stetsasonic was one of the first hip hop acts to perform with a full band and use live instrumentation in their recordings, paving the way for future hip hop bands such as The Roots. The band combined beat-boxing, sampling technology, and live band performance, incorporating R&B, jazz, dancehall reggae, and rock into its sound. Stetsasonic is also considered one of the acts that pioneered jazz rap.

Though rumored to have disbanded in 1991, soon after the release of its third album, Blood, Sweat & No Tears, Stetsasonic continues to record and perform together, as evidenced by their subsequent release, "People In The Neighborhood", and their performance at the Urban Matterz Hip Hop Festival in 2019. Individual members branched out to explore solo careers, while still maintaining Stetsasonic. Frukwan and Prince Paul were founding members of the Gravediggaz, while the latter also became a record producer, as did Daddy-O.

History
Originally, the band was known as The Stetsasonic 3 MC's. The original group consisted of Daddy-O, Delite, and Crown Supreme. Daddy-O and Delite changed the group's name and style to Stetsasonic the Hip-Hop Band. Additional members were: Wise The Human Mix Machine; Prince Paul; the Devastating Beat Creator (DBC); drummer Bobby Simmons; and Frukwan, who replaced Crown Supreme. Stetsasonic clinched a deal with Tommy Boy Records when DBC created and played the funky bassline for its debut single "If You Can't Say It All Just Say STET", live for Tom Silverman, owner of Tommy Boy. After a few months of the single being in regular rotation on radio stations, the band released its first album On Fire (1986). The album received mixed reviews, though the follow-ups, In Full Gear and Blood, Sweat & No Tears, were critically acclaimed.

A 1988 The New York Times article said that the band mirrored the rise of artistic, profound rap music: "While pop's political commentary often seems secondary to catchy melodies and commercial acceptability, rap's tough sound sharpens its commentary".  As a "hip hop band", dependent on instruments as well as turntables, the band was also known for live shows, though sometimes the "rap-show format prevented Stetsasonic from employing the band instrumentation and studio layering that make their records so distinctive."

Fruitkwan and Prince Paul were founding members of the Gravediggaz, while the latter also became a record producer. Daddy-O went on to a solo career, while also working as a record producer, working with Freestyle Fellowship, Mary J. Blige, Positive K and the Red Hot Chili Peppers, among others. Prince Paul went on to produce the trio De La Soul. Drummer Bobby Simmons pursued work in public access, forming the show Flava Videos in the mid-1990s on Channel 26 (New York). In 2017, Simmons was a contestant on the FOX game show Beat Shazam where he was partnered with singer Shannon. MC Delite is currently the President and CEO of Flight Entertainment and a public speaker. DBC proceeded to produce tracks for Third World and the Cookie Crew, among others. In 1995, he became the owner and operator of Raw Beat Productions, a music & video recording studio, located in Philadelphia. In 2016, he invented the MN-1 Advanced Portable Power System, which is a sustainable energy source with a swappable battery compartment and solar-based charging system.

Wise also participated in a few commercials in which he lends his beatbox sounds. One was for Campbell's Soup in which a cartoon of a B-boy bear beatboxes. The commercial was broadcast amid Saturday morning cartoons. Wise was also featured in a documentary on the art of the human beatbox, Breath Control: the History of the Human Beat Box, which was shown at the Tribeca Film Festival and also featured fellow human percussionists such as Doug E. Fresh, Biz Markie, Ready Rock C, and Emanon.

Stetsasonic's most recent release was "(Now Ya'll Givin' Up) Love" (2020). They proposed an upcoming album called Here We Go Again.

Discography

Studio albums

EPs

Singles

As lead artist

As featured artist

Guest appearances

References

Notes

Citations

External links
Interview with Daddy-O
Unofficial lyrics page for On Fire
Official Facebook Page

East Coast hip hop groups
Tommy Boy Records artists
Musical groups from Brooklyn
American hip hop groups
African-American musical groups
Five percenters
Musical groups established in 1979
Musical groups disestablished in 1991
Musical groups reestablished in 2008
Alternative hip hop groups